is a former Japanese actress and model. From June 2007 to April 2009, she was an exclusive model for the magazine Pichi Lemon.

Career

On December 3, 2012, Shinohara posted on her blog that she was retiring from entertainment on December 31, 2012. After retiring, in 2014, Shinohara revealed that she is employed at Pony Canyon in the advertising department.

Filmography

Television

Film

Theater

Solo DVDs

References

1993 births
Living people
21st-century Japanese actresses
Japanese female models